

Canadian Football News in 1897
The Canadian Intercollegiate Rugby Football Union was formed after the conclusion of the 1897 season.

In the Manitoba Rugby Football Union, the Royal Canadian Dragoons dropped out of competition in the spring of 1898. The three remaining teams finished the schedule in a three-way tie for first place. Tie-breaker games could not be scheduled as the college teams were involved in final exams.

Final regular season standings
Note: GP = Games Played, W = Wins, L = Losses, T = Ties, PF = Points For, PA = Points Against, Pts = Points

Bold text means that they have clinched the playoffs

League champions

Playoffs

ORFU Final

Dominion Championship

References

 
Canadian Football League seasons